Kihihi, also spelt Kihiihi, is a town in Southwestern Uganda. It is the second-largest metropolitan area in Kanungu District, after Kanungu, where the district headquarters are located.

Location
The coordinates of Kihiihi are:0°44'56.0"S, 29°42'01.0"E (Latitude:-0.748889; Longitude:29.700278).

Overview
The town accommodates a large refugee camp administered by the United Nations High Commission for Refugees (UNHCR). It also has one bank (Stanbic Bank), one ATM and several motels and lodges.

Population
In 2002, the population census put the population of the town at 15,935. In 2010, the Uganda Bureau of Statistics (UBOS), estimated the population of Kihiihi at approximately 18,800. In 2011, UBOS estimated the population at 19,200 people. In 2014, the national population census put the population of Kihiihi at 20,349.

Points of interest
The following points of interest are found in Kihiihi, or close to its town limits:

 The offices and refugee camp of the UNHCR.
 The offices of Kihihi Town Council
 Kihihi Farmers Market 
 A branch of Stanbic Bank.
 Garuga Airstrip
 Well-stocked supermarkets
 Boutiques
 Salons
 Kihiihi Town Council office
 Kinkiizi Radio Station
 Kinkizi Polytechnic
 Self-Contained Motels
 Bus Terminus Kihiihi-Kampala route
 Religious Worshiping Centres
 Sevpnary Schools

See also
Kanungu District
Kigezi sub-region
Ugandan Towns

References

External links
 Kanungu District Gets Second Bank

Populated places in Western Region, Uganda
Kanungu District
Kigezi sub-region